The Ontonagon River is a river flowing into Lake Superior at the village of Ontonagon, on the western Upper Peninsula of Michigan in the United States. Several waterfalls occur on the river including Agate Falls and Bond Falls.

Course
The Ontonagon River's principal tributaries are its West, South, Middle and East branches, all of which flow in part through the Ottawa National Forest:
The West Branch Ontonagon River is entirely contained in Ontonagon County.
The South Branch Ontonagon River is formed in southwestern Ontonagon County by the confluence of the short Tenmile Creek and the Cisco Branch Ontonagon River.
After collecting the Tamarack River, the Middle Branch turns northwardly into Ontonagon County, where it collects the Baltimore River and joins the East Branch.

National Wild and Scenic River designation
On March 3, 1992, the following reaches of the Ontonagon's upper tributaries were collectively designated the Ontonagon National Wild and Scenic River:  The upper courses of the East and Middle branches in the Ottawa National Forest; the Cisco Branch in its entirety; and approximately the middle section of the West Branch, from Cascade Falls to the Victoria Reservoir.

Other historical significance
During the mid-19th century, a very large mass of solid, nearly pure copper, the Ontonagon Boulder, was removed from the Ontonagon River. It now is in the Smithsonian National Museum of Natural History in Washington, D.C.

See also
List of Michigan rivers

References

Rivers of Michigan
Wild and Scenic Rivers of the United States
Rivers of Gogebic County, Michigan
Rivers of Houghton County, Michigan
Rivers of Iron County, Michigan
Rivers of Ontonagon County, Michigan
Tributaries of Lake Superior